Eulepidotis stella is a moth of the family Erebidae first described by Constant Bar in 1875. It is found in the Neotropical realm, including French Guiana and Guyana.

References

Moths described in 1875
stella